Sedum lanceolatum is a species of flowering plant in the family Crassulaceae known by the common names spearleaf stonecrop and lanceleaf stonecrop.

It is native to western North America and occurs in western Canada and the United States. It is distributed from Alaska to Arizona and New Mexico and as far east as South Dakota and Nebraska. The plant persisted and evolved on sky islands and nunataks in these ranges during glaciation events during the Pleistocene epoch.

Smaller leaves occur farther up the stem and often fall away by the time the plant blooms. The inflorescence is made up of one or more erect arrays of several flowers. The flowers have yellow petals sometimes tinged with red, each lance-shaped petal just under a centimeter long. The stamens are tipped with yellow anthers. The plant reproduces sexually by its tiny, lightweight seeds, or vegetatively when sections of its stem break off and root.

Ecology
Sedum lanceolatum is the host plant of the butterfly species Parnassius smintheus. The plant produces a deterrent cyanoglycoside, so that herbivores do not feed on it. This butterfly's larvae sequester sarmentosin from the plant for their own defense. However, it has been found that if the plant becomes physically damaged by mechanical means, the larvae feeding on it have reduced growth rates, possibly due to an induced defense by the plant itself. While damage by insects does not cause defense by S. lanceolatum, damage from feeding by the larvae does induce defense by the plant. Consequently, the larvae often hurry to feed, then switch to another plant within the time window offering highest nutritional quality. Larvae will typically feed and leave a plant in less than half an hour. From November to February, the leaves of their foodplant are fatally toxic to the larvae, but for the rest of the year, the larvae feed and develop normally. If the snow melts before March, the eggs hatch while the larval foodplant is still toxic, and the larvae perish.

References

External links
Sedum lanceolatum Jepson Manual Treatment
Sedum lanceolatum USDA Plants Profile
Sedum lanceolatum Washington Burke Museum
Photo gallery by CalPhotos

lanceolatum
Flora of the Western United States
Flora of the North-Central United States
Flora of California
Flora of Colorado
Flora of the Sierra Nevada (United States)
Flora of the Rocky Mountains
Flora without expected TNC conservation status